Oldenburg Historic District is a national historic district located at Oldenburg and Ray Township, Franklin County, Indiana.  The district encompasses 106 contributing buildings, 2 contributing sites, and 6 contributing structures in the central business district and surrounding residential sections of Oldenburg.  It developed between about 1837 and 1930, and includes a variety of popular architectural styles.  Notable contributing buildings include the Town Hall (1878), Holy Family Church (1862), First Corpus Christi Church, Second Corpus Christi Church, Cemetery Chapel (c. 1880), Convent Chapel (1889-1901), Convent of the Immaculate Conception (1889-1901), Franciscan Monastery (1894), Stone Church (1846-1848), Waechter's Cradle Shop (1845), Oldenburg Lumber Company (c. 1885), Brockman House (c. 1890), George Holtel House (c. 1865), Fischer Tavern (c. 1850), Burdick Building, Hackman Store (1861-1862), Roell Farm House (c. 1865), and Kellerman House (c. 1860, 1902).

It was listed on the National Register of Historic Places in 1983.

References

External links
 

Historic districts on the National Register of Historic Places in Indiana
Historic districts in Franklin County, Indiana
National Register of Historic Places in Franklin County, Indiana
1837 establishments in Indiana